Radzyń Podlaski Castle is a complex of a palace and castle built between 1685 and 1709, and expanded between 1750 and 1759.

History

The first building in Radzyń Podlaski ties with the new owner Stanisław Antoni Szczuka (died in 1710). In 1685, works on the complex began by John III Sobieski, which commissioned the works to the architect Augustyn Wincenty Locci. The complex was built from 1685 to 1709, in the location of a fifteenth century Baroque castle of the Kaznowski's Suchekomnaty Coat of Arms; the complex was built to function as a residence and defensive stronghold. Jakub Fontana became the main architect of the complex, who also carried out the expansion of the complex between 1750 and 1759, for Eustachy Potocki of the Piława Coat of Arms.

See also
Castles in Poland

References

Castles in Lublin Voivodeship
Radzyń Podlaski County
Buildings and structures in the Polish–Lithuanian Commonwealth